Immortal Guards may refer to:

 The Persian Immortals, existing in Persia under the Achaemenean dynasty
 Immortals (Byzantine Empire), established under the Byzantine emperor Michael VII
 The Immortals, the Iranian Imperial Guard, existing in Persia and Iran in the 20th century under the Pahlavi dynasty
 The Immortals, Nihang warriors or Sikh Akalis who have played the pivotal role in Sikh military history

See also
 Imperial Guard (Napoleon I), elite French soldiers under Napoleon I nicknamed "the Immortals"